The following is a list of world sports championships, including some sporting events which use a different name with a similar meaning. In some sports, there is a world series, but that term usually has a somewhat different meaning.

Tournaments which are formally defunct or where a further event is not currently planned are marked with a gray background.

Open gender world championship titles

Male gender world championship titles

Female world championship titles

Mixed-sex

See also
 World championship
 World cup
 List of world championships in mind sports
 List of world cups and world championships for juniors and youth
 List of multi-sport events
 List of world cups

Notes 

 R.   – One or more relay events, in which three or four competitors compete for their nation, are included for each sex.

References 

World championships